Kentucky Route 121 (KY 121) is a  state highway in Kentucky. It runs from State Route 119 (SR 119) at the Kentucky–Tennessee state line southeast of New Concord to U.S. Route 51 (US 51) and US 62 in Wickliffe via Murray and Mayfield.

Major intersections

Mayfield business loop

Kentucky Route 121 Business is a  business route of Kentucky Route 121. It runs from Kentucky Route 121, Kentucky Route 80, and Kentucky Route 97 southeast of Mayfield to Kentucky Route 121 and U.S. Route 45 north of Mayfield. It runs through downtown, while KY 121 uses a bypass to the east and north. It runs concurrent with U.S. Route 45 for its final two miles.

Major intersections

References

0121
Transportation in Calloway County, Kentucky
Transportation in Graves County, Kentucky
Transportation in Carlisle County, Kentucky
Transportation in Ballard County, Kentucky